BB20 may refer to:

Big Brother 20 (disambiguation), a television program in various versions 
, a United States Navy battleship